Chattoogaville is an unincorporated community in Chattooga County, in the U.S. state of Georgia.

History
A post office called Chattoogaville was established in 1840, and remained in operation until it was discontinued in 1906. The community takes its name from nearby Chattooga River.

References

Unincorporated communities in Chattooga County, Georgia
Unincorporated communities in Georgia (U.S. state)